Milo Garlock Knutson (October 12, 1917March 22, 1981) was an American radio broadcaster and Republican politician.  He was the 44th mayor of La Crosse, Wisconsin, (1955–1965) and represented La Crosse for 8 years in the Wisconsin State Senate (1969–1977).

Biography

Born in Clear Lake, Iowa, Knutson attended junior college in Mason City, Iowa, and Coe College in Cedar Rapids, Iowa. Knutson moved to La Crosse, Wisconsin, where he became the news director for WKTY. From 1955 until 1965, Knutson was the Mayor of La Crosse. Knutson served in the Wisconsin State Senate from 1969 until 1977 retiring because of health reasons.

References

External links
 

1917 births
1981 deaths
American radio directors
Coe College alumni
People from Clear Lake, Iowa
Radio personalities from Wisconsin
Republican Party Wisconsin state senators
Mayors of La Crosse, Wisconsin
20th-century American politicians